In mathematics, restriction of scalars (also known as "Weil restriction") is a functor which, for any finite extension of fields L/k and any algebraic variety X over L, produces another variety ResL/kX, defined over k. It is useful for reducing questions about varieties over large fields to questions about more complicated varieties over smaller fields.

Definition 

Let L/k be a finite extension of fields, and X a variety defined over L. The functor  from k-schemesop to sets is defined by

The variety that represents this functor is called the restriction of scalars, and is unique up to unique isomorphism if it exists.

From the standpoint of sheaves of sets, restriction of scalars is just a pushforward along the morphism  and is right adjoint to fiber product of schemes, so the above definition can be rephrased in much more generality. In particular, one can replace the extension of fields by any morphism of ringed topoi, and the hypotheses on X can be weakened to e.g. stacks. This comes at the cost of having less control over the behavior of the restriction of scalars.

Alternative definition 
Let  be a morphism of schemes. For a -scheme , if the contravariant functor

Where  denotes the dual of the category of schemes over a fixed scheme .

Properties 

For any finite extension of fields, the restriction of scalars takes quasiprojective varieties to quasiprojective varieties. The dimension of the resulting variety is multiplied by the degree of the extension.

Under appropriate hypotheses (e.g., flat, proper, finitely presented), any morphism  of algebraic spaces yields a restriction of scalars functor that takes algebraic stacks to algebraic stacks, preserving properties such as Artin, Deligne-Mumford, and representability.

Examples and applications 
Simple examples are the following: 
 Let L be a finite extension of k of degree s.

If a scheme is a group scheme then any Weil restriction of it will be as well. This is frequently used in number theory, for instance: 
See Mumford–Tate group.
 The Weil restriction  of a (commutative) group variety  is again a (commutative) group variety of dimension  if L is separable over k.
 Restriction of scalars on abelian varieties (e.g. elliptic curves) yields abelian varieties, if L is separable over k. James Milne used this to reduce the Birch and Swinnerton-Dyer conjecture for abelian varieties over all number fields to the same conjecture over the rationals.
 In elliptic curve cryptography, the Weil descent attack uses the Weil restriction to transform a discrete logarithm problem on an elliptic curve over a finite extension field L/K, into a discrete log problem on the Jacobian variety of a hyperelliptic curve over the base field K, that is potentially easier to solve because of K's smaller size.

Weil restrictions vs. Greenberg transforms 

Restriction of scalars is similar to the Greenberg transform, but does not generalize it, since the ring of Witt vectors on a commutative algebra A is not in general an A-algebra.

References 

The original reference is Section 1.3 of Weil's 1959-1960 Lectures, published as:

 Andre Weil. "Adeles and Algebraic Groups", Progress in Math. 23, Birkhäuser 1982. Notes of Lectures given 1959-1960.

Other references:

 Siegfried Bosch, Werner Lütkebohmert, Michel Raynaud. "Néron models", Springer-Verlag, Berlin 1990.
 James S. Milne. "On the arithmetic of abelian varieties", Invent. Math. 17 (1972) 177-190.
 Martin Olsson. "Hom stacks and restriction of scalars", Duke Math J., 134 (2006), 139–164. http://math.berkeley.edu/~molsson/homstackfinal.pdf
 Bjorn Poonen. "Rational points on varieties", http://math.mit.edu/~poonen/papers/Qpoints.pdf
 Nigel Smart, Weil descent page with bibliography, https://homes.esat.kuleuven.be/~nsmart/weil_descent.html
 Aleksander Momot, "Density of rational points on commutative group varieties and small transcendence degree", https://arxiv.org/abs/1011.3368 
Algebraic varieties
Scheme theory